Cochylimorpha elegans is a moth species in the family Tortricidae. It is found in Iran (the type location is Khorassan, Kouh-i-Binaloud).

References

Cochylimorpha
Moths described in 1963
Taxa named by Józef Razowski
Moths of Asia